Root is a Czech black metal band.

Biography 
Root were formed by vocalist Big Boss and guitarist Blackie in late 1987. According to Big Boss, in the beginning, they knew no foreign bands and could do no tape trading. Although the first demo recording mentioned on their homepage's discography section is Deep in Hell, according to their biography, they recorded their first official demo tape Reap of Hell after a few rehearsals. Root played their first concert in September 1988. The next demo cassette, War of Rats, was released in 1988, followed by Messengers from Darkness in 1989. Vocalist Big Boss played drums on these recordings. Whereas Messengers from Darkness is mentioned as "the third and last" demo cassette in their biography, the discography section lists The Trial as the last one.

In 1990, the band released the single 7 černých jezdců / 666, with artwork done by Master's Hammer vocalist František Štorm. To promote their first album, Zjevení (again with artwork by Štorm), they recorded a video for their song "Hřbitov", released on the Czech Death Metal Session compilation, with photographs by Štorm. Zjevení was also released as The Revelation.

The second album, Hell Symphony, followed in 1992. In 1993, Root released their third album, The Temple in the Underworld, and recorded a video for the song "Aposiopesis". The following years "were in the sign of personal problems between two main personalities of ROOT, Big Boss and Blackie". In 1996, Root released their first concept album, Kärgeräs. Their fifth album, The Book, followed in 1999.

In 2004, Root played on the Open Hell festival with Watain, Törr and other bands. In 2011, they released the album Heritage of Satan, featuring Aura Noir and Ava Inferi guitarist Rune "Blasphemer" Eriksen, Behemoth vocalist Adam "Nergal" Darski and Watain vocalist Erik Danielsson, who also created the album cover, as guest musicians. Although Big Boss is the only remaining founding member, the band's core now consists of him, bass player Golem and guitarist Ashok.

On 28 September 2016 the band announced that they begun work on their tenth studio album, Kärgeräs – Return from Oblivion, the sequel to their 1996 concept album Kärgeräs. It was released on 25 November 2016.

Musical style and ideology 
According to Legacy journalist Christian Wachter, Root have, since their beginning, a very own style (although ostensibly Venom- and Bathory-oriented) with an occult aura and are one of the few bands deserving the term "cult". Portuguese band Moonspell mentioned Root as one of their influences. Rock Hard journalist Björn Thorsten Jaschinski called them "occult metal pioneers". His colleague Wolf-Rüdiger Mühlmann located The Book "in the triangle of death metal, gothic metal and gloomy rock" with folklore melodies that could be interesting for fans of Katatonia, My Dying Bride, Primordial and Thine. On Root's homepage, Black Seal is described as a mixture of "the heaviness of 'Hell Symphony', monumentality of 'The Temple In The Underworld', mystery of 'Kargeras' and the dark charm of 'The Book'"; Mühlmann described it as a mix of Mercyful Fate, Moonspell, Anathema and old heavy metal. For Decibel journalist Chris D., Heritage of Satan "feels less complete than, say, The Book, which is, for me at least, the best Root album to date". The album features "a few rocking songs", "Revenge of Hell" and "Legacy of Ancestors", as well as "more traditional black metal songs".

Big Boss founded the Czech branch of the Church of Satan. He still lives his life according to Satanism, but "gave away all agenda […] to younger ones" and now believes that "everything that smells of organization is shit". Although Root are therefore close to LaVeyan Satanism, Watain (whose vocalist Erik Danielsson contributed to Heritage of Satan), who are Devil worshippers, called them and Törr "the legendary kings of Czech Black/Death Metal" and "defenders of the faith" when they announced they would play on the Open Hell festival in 2004. According to Big Boss, "the difference between us and Scandinavian groups is that I sing about Satanic magic and myths I create personally, whereas Swedes, Norwegians etc. sing about things that are already known. They therefore have another approach to these topics." On Heritage of Satan, the topic is the final, successful assault of the infernal hordes onto the earth, after which Satan gives His power to His son.

Band members

Current members 
 Jiří "Big Boss" Valter – vocals (previously drums 1987–1989)
 Igor "Golem" Hubík – bass guitar
 Aleš "Alesh A.D." Dostál – guitar (1996–1999; 2014–)
 Jiří "Mr. G Háb – guitar
 Zbyněk "Mr Zet" Husa – drums

Former members 
 Robert "Dr. Fe" Krčmář – vocals (1988–1989)
 Zdeněk "Mr. Zet" Odehnal – guitar (1988)
 Petr "Mr. Cross" Kříž – guitar (1989)
 Petr "Mr. Death" Pálenský – guitar (1989)
 Dan "Mr. D.A.N." Janáček – guitar (1990–1992)
 Aleš "Alesh A.D." Dostál – guitar (1996–1999,2014)
 Petr "Blackie" Hošek – guitar (1987–2004)
 Rostislav "Black Drum" Mozga – drums (1989–1991)
 Aleš "Poison" Jedonek – guitar (2005–2007)
 Marek "Deadly" Fryčák – drums (2007–2008)
 Peter Hrnčirík – drums (2009–2010)
 René "Evil" Kostelňák – guitar (2007–2011, previously drums 1992–2007)
 Marek "Ashok" Šmerda – guitar (1998–2014)

Discography

Demos

Albums

DVDs

Contributions 
 "Hrbitov" on Death Metal Session (1990)

References

External links 
 Official website

Czech black metal musical groups
Musical groups established in 1987
Musical quintets